Richard Allen (1803–1886) was a draper, a philanthropist and abolitionist in Dublin. Allen raised £20,000 to help the Irish famine by writing letters to America.

Life
Allen was born to Edward and Ellen Allen at Harold's Cross near Dublin. He was the second of fifteen children.

Allen was an orthodox Quaker and his business was in textiles but his interests were in reform, temperance and the abolition of slavery. He married Ann Webb in 1828.

In 1837, Allen was one of three founding members, with James Haughton and Richard Davis Webb, of the Hibernian Antislavery Association. This was not the first antislavery association but it was acknowledged to be the most active. Allen served as the secretary of this association.

Allen founded the Irish Temperance and Literary Gazette and used this publication to forward his ideas and those of the Anti-Slavery Association.

Opposition to slavery in Ireland had a long pedigree. As was the case in Britain, its most prominent Irish supporters were Protestant, notably Methodists, Quakers and Unitarians, and meetings were generally held in Nonconformist churches. One of the greatest contributions to the anti-slavery debate was made by the flamboyant and controversial Irish nationalist, Daniel O’Connell, champion of Catholic Emancipation.

Richard Allen's parents home is proposed to be a protected building, because Allen was brought up there and also because it became a Plymouth Brethren Orphanage around 1860.

In 1840 his portrait was included with other notables in a painting of the 1840 World Anti-Slavery Convention in London.

In 1846, Allen attended another World convention in London. This time the subject was temperance and Allen was one of the speakers. Allen noted that he had been visiting Dublin's Bridewell prison and considered that parts were becoming empty because of the increase intemperance.

Famine was rife in Ireland and in 1847 Allen wrote letters to America to explain the people's plight. William Lloyd Garrison acknowledged the effect that Allen's letters to America had attracted. He estimated that £20,000 pounds had been raised.

References

1803 births
1886 deaths
Irish writers
Irish Quakers
Philanthropists from Dublin (city)
Irish abolitionists
People from Harold's Cross
19th-century Irish people
19th-century philanthropists
Quaker abolitionists